Mary Jo Andres Buscemi (May 21, 1954 – January 6, 2019) was an American filmmaker, choreographer and artist.

Early life and career
Andres was born in Wichita, Kansas, on May 21, 1954. She first became known on the kinetic downtown New York performance scene of the 1980s for her film/dance/light performances, shown at the Performing Garage, La Mama Experimental Theater Club
P.S. 122, St. Marks Danspace, and the Collective for Living Cinema. As a filmmaker, Andres drew acclaim and awards for the 1996 film Black Kites which aired on PBS and played several film festivals, including Sundance, Berlin, Toronto, London and Human Rights Watch Film Festivals. Andres directed music and art videos, as well as her own film performance works. Andres was a dance consultant to the acclaimed Wooster Group.

She was an artist-in-residence at leading universities, museums and art colonies, including Yaddo, and The Rockefeller Study Center in Bellagio, Italy. Andres created a series of cyanotype photographs which can be seen on her website.

Personal life
She married actor Steve Buscemi in 1987; they had one son, Lucian, born in 1990.

Death
Andres died at her home in Brooklyn on January 6, 2019, at age 64, from encapsulating peritoneal sclerosis, a rare disease of the bowel. A private memorial service was held on January 8.

Filmography
 1992: What Happened to Pete (directed by Steve Buscemi) (editor)
 1996: Black Kites (director, editor, special effects director)
 1998: Piece of Cake (music video for Mimi Goese) (director)
 1998: The Impostors (choreographer)
 2000: Lillian Kiesler: On The Head Of A Pin (director)

Notes

References

External links
 
 

1954 births
2019 deaths
American choreographers
American filmmakers
Artists from New York City